Ward 1 is a ward of Mỹ Tho in Tiền Giang Province, Vietnam.

References

Communes of Tien Giang province
Populated places in Tiền Giang province